Aleksandr Olegovich Mukhin (born 29 April 2002) is a Russian football player. He plays for FC Ufa on loan from FC Rostov.

Club career
He was raised in the FC Lokomotiv Moscow academy and represented the club in the 2019–20 UEFA Youth League.

He made his debut for the main squad of FC Rostov on 27 October 2021 in a Russian Cup game against FC Torpedo Moscow. He made his Russian Premier League debut for Rostov on 14 March 2022 against FC Rubin Kazan, becoming the first ever sixth substitute in a league game, after regular 5 substitutions were made and another player had to leave the game due to a suspected head injury.

On 13 December 2022, Mukhin extended his contract with Rostov until 2026.

On 2 February 2023, Mukhin was loaned by FC Ufa in the Russian First League.

International career
He represented Russia at the 2019 UEFA European Under-17 Championship, Russia did not advance from the group stage.

Career statistics

References

External links
 
 
 
 

2002 births
People from Serpukhov
Sportspeople from Moscow Oblast
Living people
Russian footballers
Russia youth international footballers
Association football defenders
FC Lokomotiv Moscow players
FC Rostov players
FC Ufa players
Russian Second League players
Russian Premier League players